Sujan Mayura (born 11 September 1989) is a Sri Lankan cricketer. He made his List A debut for Police Sports Club in the 2018–19 Premier Limited Overs Tournament on 4 March 2019. He made his Twenty20 debut on 6 January 2020, for Police Sports Club in the 2019–20 SLC Twenty20 Tournament.

References

External links
 

1989 births
Living people
Sri Lankan cricketers
Sri Lanka Police Sports Club cricketers
Place of birth missing (living people)